Brynteg School is one of the largest secondary schools in Wales. It is located on Ewenny Road  in Bridgend, Wales. The school is one of seven comprehensive schools in the County Borough of Bridgend and mainly receives pupils from the Brackla, Litchard and Town Centre (Morfa) areas.

History
Brynteg, whilst not becoming a comprehensive school until 1971, can trace its roots and history back to 1896.

Bridgend Intermediate School (1896-1935) 
The Bridgend Intermediate School in Morfa Street (now Penybont Primary School) was opened on 21 September 1896. The boys' section of the school was opened by South Glamorganshire MP  Arthur J Willimas while the girls' section was opened by Lady Rachel Wyndham-Quinn, daughter of Lord Dynraven, who had donated land for the school. The school's fees were £1 5s per term in addition to stationary costs of 1s 18d per term plus text books which pupils were charged a 25% discount.

By 1904 the school had exceeded its planned capacity of 120. In 1907 there were 276 pupils (116 boys and 92 girls). Over the coming years various extensions and alterations were made to the school and individual classrooms to help accommodate growing pupil numbers. Pupil numbers reached 500 by 1931.

Single sex education (1935-1971) 
As pupil numbers continued to grow a new 15 acre site was identified off Ewenny Road and a new school (renamed Bridgend Grammar School for Boys in 1945) was built and opened in 1935 at the cost of £25,000 (almost £1.8 million in 2020). The school was built on the site of Brynteg House. The official opening ceremony of the new school took place on 26 September 1935 and was attended by Oliver Stanley, president of the Board of Education.
Girls meanwhile continued to be taught at the original site where their numbers increased from 260 in 1935 to 360 in 1946 under their headmistress E N Evans. The school eventually became The Girls Grammar School

Heolgam County Secondary School (1948-1971) 
A mile away from the new boys' school, Heolgam County Secondary School opened in July 1948 with 250 pupils and 12 staff. When the school opened The Glamorgan Gazette described it as having
“Six classrooms, a science room, a lecture room, two large gymnasiums, wood and metal work rooms, an art and craft room, two domestic science rooms, dining halls, offices and a large Assembly Hall with a good sized stage.”
Heolgam expanded rapidly and an additional five classrooms were built in 1954.
The school continued until its closure on 31 August 1971.

Head teachers of Heolgam County Secondary School 
Gwyn I Thomas, Jan 1948 – Feb 1954
A M Graville, Feb 1954 – Easter 1966
C H Nicholls, Sept 1966 – July 1970
G Mead, July 1970 – August 1971

Brynteg Comprehensive School (1971) 
The merger of Bridgend Boys' Grammar School and Heolgam Secondary School took place on 1 September 1971 and Brynteg Comprehensive School was formed, with Heolgam serving as the lower school (forms I to III/years 7-9) and the old Boys' Grammar school serving as the upper school (forms IV to VI/years 10-13). Pupils travelled between the two sites using local roads and footpaths until the construction of an internal footpath in the early 1990s.

Admissions
Brynteg is one of the largest schools in South Wales with 1,584 students at its last inspection in December 2016.

The student body is divided into five year groups and two sixth form years.

Facilities
The school is located on Ewenny Road (B4265) close to the roundabout with the A48, opposite the Heronsbridge School which shares some architectural qualities with the Upper School. Brynteg has two rugby pitches, a cricket field, a gravel hockey pitch, tennis courts and a large indoor sports hall. In recent years, the school saw the construction of a new 13-room maths block, a ten-room science block (opened in 2000) and a 12-room foreign language block (opened 2002), all built between Lower and Upper School.

Between 2003 and 2009 a further eight classrooms were built: a four-room art block a four-room English block.

Recent Estyn reports have criticised the school for a reliance on temporary classrooms (portacabins) with 17 in 2009, down from 23 in 2003.

In September 2019 the school reorganised with the former lower school site becoming the languages, literacy and communication centre, while the former upper school site became the humanities centre. Mathematics and sciences remain taught in their own buildings.

The former modern languages block was converted into the pupil well-being and reception centre which houses the main school reception, the headteacher, the pupil support team, the school nurse, careers advisor and the school counsellor.

Headteachers

 John Rankin, 1896-1929
 W E Thomas, 1929-1953
 Haden Jones, 1953-1960
 Frank J Anthony, 1960-1969
 Trevor H Thomas, 1969-1979 
 Bill Rowlands, 1978-1991 
 Chris Davies, 1991-2010 
 David Jenkins, 2010-2017 
 Ryan Davies, 2017–present

Sport
The school is known for rugby union, and several former pupils have played for Wales and for the British and Irish Lions.

Academic performance
In regards to examination performance records, the school is also favourable academically with 75% of GCSE students achieving 5 A*–C grades in their examinations.

Brynteg is also a venue for the Welsh Baccaulaureate, a new qualification offered to Welsh students studying at GCSE, A2 and AS Level.

Traditions
The school motto is in Welsh A fo ben bid bont which translates as "To be a leader, be a bridge". Traditionally, year 8 write and hold the school's harvest assembly in October.

The school holds a Remembrance Day service on or as close to 11 November every year during which the names of 87 former pupils who died in conflicts are read out.

Feeder schools

Brackla Primary School
Litchard Primary School
Oldcastle Primary School
Penybont Primary School
Tremains Primary School 
Maes Yr Haul Primary School

Notable former pupils

Politics

 Garfield Davies, trade unionist and Labour peer. 
 Janice Gregory, former Welsh Labour Assembly Member and chief whip  
 Carwyn Jones, former First Minister for Wales
  Maria Miller, Conservative MP for Basingstoke, former secretary of state for culture, media and sport
 Jamie Wallis, Conservative MP for Bridgend

Rugby union

 Melbourne Thomas, (Bridgend, St. Bats), Wales, 6 caps 1919–1924
 Jack Matthews, (Cardiff), Wales, 17 caps 1947–1951, British Lions, 6 caps 1950
 Ken Richards, (Bridgend), Wales, 5 caps 1960–61
 J.P.R. Williams (Bridgend, London Welsh), Wales, 55 caps 1969–1981, British Lions, 8 caps 1971 & 1974
 Gareth Powell Williams (Bridgend), Wales, 5 caps 1981–1982
 Mike Hall (Cardiff), Wales, (Captain) 42 caps 1988–1995, British Lions, 1 cap 1989
 Neil Boobyer, (Llanelli RFC), Wales, 7 caps 1993-1999
 Rob Howley (Bridgend, Cardiff, Wasps), Wales, (Captain) 59 caps 1995–2002, British Lions, 2 caps 1997 & 2001
 Dafydd James (Bridgend, etc.), Wales, 49 caps 1995–2007, British Lions, 3 caps 2001
 Nathan Thomas, (Bridgend, Cardiff Blues, Scarlets), Wales 9 caps 1996-1998
 Gavin Henson (Swansea, Ospreys), Wales, 33 caps 2001–, British Lions, 1 cap 2005
 James Bater, (Llanelli Scarlets), Wales, 1 cap 2003
 Gareth John Williams, (Cardiff Blues), Wales, 9 caps 2003–2011
 Josh Navidi, (Cardiff Blues), Wales, 16 cap 2013–
 Rhys Webb, (Ospreys), wales 5 caps 2012–
 Tom Habberfield, (Ospreys)
 Matthew Morgan, (Ospreys, Bristol, Cardiff Blues), Wales, 5 caps 2014–
 Scott Baldwin, (Ospreys, Harlequins), Wales, 34 caps 2013–

Rugby league

 Kevin Ellis (Warrington Wolves), Wales, 15 caps 1991-2004, Great Britain, 1 cap 1991
 Ollie Olds (Leeds Rhinos), Wales, 1 cap 2012–
 Ben Evans (Warrington Wolves), Wales, 4 caps 2012–
 Rhys Evans (Warrington Wolves), Wales, 3 caps 2013–

Journalism
 Paul Burston, British journalist, author, broadcaster and curator
 Rebecca John, BBC Wales Today presenter/reporter

Olympic champions
 Nicole Cooke, road bicycle racer, Olympic champion 2008
 Helen Miles, 100m sprinter, Olympic Games (1988), Commonwealth Games (1986), European Junior Games (1985)

Other

 Keith Burnett, vice-chancellor of the University of Sheffield since 2007, professor of physics at the University of Oxford from 1996 to 2007
 Michael Brown, vice-chancellor of Liverpool John Moores University since 2000 
 Aled Miles, businessman
 Robert Minhinnick, poet 
 Ronald Lewis, actor 
 Gary Owen, playwright
 John V. Tucker, computer scientist 
 Maggie O'Farrell, novelist.
 Callum MacLeod, Love Island series 5

Former teachers
 Wayne David, Labour MP for Caerphilly
 Lynn Davies Olympic champion (long jump) 1964 Tokyo Games (Bridgend Grammar School PE teacher)

Notes

References

External links
 Estyn Reports

Secondary schools in Bridgend County Borough
Educational institutions established in 1971
1971 establishments in Wales